George Washington Woodward (March 26, 1809May 10, 1875) was a Democratic member of the U.S. House of Representatives from Pennsylvania.

George W. Woodward was born in Bethany, Pennsylvania. He attended Geneva Seminary (now Hobart and William Smith Colleges) in Geneva, New York, and Wilkes-Barre Academy in Wilkes-Barre, Pennsylvania. He studied law, was admitted to the bar in 1830 and commenced practice in Wilkes-Barre. He was a delegate to the State constitutional convention in 1837. He served as president judge of the fourth judicial district from 1841 to 1851.

He was an unsuccessful candidate for United States Senator in 1844. Woodward was nominated in 1845 by President James K. Polk as an associate justice of the Supreme Court of the United States but the United States Senate voted 20–29 not to confirm him. Woodward was an associate judge of the Supreme Court of Pennsylvania from 1852 to 1863 and chief justice from 1863 to 1867. He was an unsuccessful Democratic candidate for governor in 1863.

Woodward was elected as a Democrat to the Fortieth Congress to fill the vacancy caused by the death of Charles Denison. He was reelected to the Forty-first Congress. He was not a candidate for renomination in 1870. He was a delegate to the 1868 Democratic National Convention. He was an unsuccessful candidate for president judge of the eleventh judicial district in 1870. He moved to Philadelphia prior to 1860 and continued the practice of law. He was a delegate to the State constitutional convention in 1873. He traveled abroad in 1874 and died in Rome in the Kingdom of Italy in 1875. Interment in Hollenback Cemetery in Wilkes-Barre, Pennsylvania.

His son, George A. Woodward, would become a brigadier general in the United States Army.

Sources

George Washington Woodward at Find A Grave

|-

|-

1809 births
1875 deaths
19th-century American politicians
Democratic Party members of the United States House of Representatives from Pennsylvania
Hobart and William Smith Colleges alumni
People from Bethany, Pennsylvania
Politicians from Wilkes-Barre, Pennsylvania
Pennsylvania lawyers
Pennsylvania state court judges
Justices of the Supreme Court of Pennsylvania
Unsuccessful nominees to the United States Supreme Court
19th-century American judges
19th-century American lawyers